Whapmagoostui ("place of the beluga") is the northernmost Cree village in Quebec, Canada, located at the mouth of the Great Whale River on the coast of Hudson Bay in Nunavik. About 906 Cree with about 650 Inuit, living in the neighbouring village of Kuujjuarapik. The community is accessible only by air (Kuujjuarapik Airport) and, in late summer, by boat.

Although the permanent cohabitation of Inuit and Cree at the mouth of the Great Whale River goes back only 1950, the two nations were rubbing shoulders in the area for a very long time, with the Inuit close to the coast and the Cree more in the interior.

Names
The village was settle on territory originally named Fort Richmond. The settlement's first official name was Poste-de-la-Baleine.

The name "Whapmagoostui" is Cree for "place of the beluga".

Geography
The territory of the Cree reserved land of Whapmagoostui must be distinguished from the territory of the homonymous Cree village municipality. The reserved land is located entirely on the north bank of the Great Whale River for a distance of approximately 43 kilometers. On the other hand, it does not have any coastline on James Bay, separated from it by the northern village and the Inuit reserve land of Kuujjuarapik.

To the north and south of the Cree reserved land is the unorganized territory of Baie-d'Hudson, while the Cree village municipality of Whapmagoostui is to the southwest, east and southeast of the Cree reserved land.

The Cree reserved land includes the urbanized core of Whapmagoostui, which is also bordering that of Kuujjuarapik, like two neighboring neighborhoods of the same city.

History
The Cree have hunted and fished along the Hudson Bay coast long before the arrival of Europeans, it was not until 1820 when a Hudson's Bay Company trading post was built here, known variously as Great Whale River House, Great Whale River or just Great Whale. On maps of 1851 and 1854, the post is called Whale River House and Whale House. Protestant and Catholic missions settled there in the 1880s. In 1895, a weather station was set up by the Federal Government. Medical and police services began to be offered in the first half of the 20th century. Yet the Cree would not settle here permanently and only used it as a summer encampment.

In 1940 the Cree were forced to give up their nomadic way of life when the American army opened a military air base here. In 1941, the HBC post closed. After the World War II in 1948, the military base was transferred to the Canadian government. And in 1955, it began operating a Mid-Canada Line radar station. Though the radar station was not operational for long and closed in 1965, it established the village permanently.

In 1961, when the Quebec Government decided to give French names to northern settlements, the name Great Whale River was replaced with Grande-Baleine which itself was replaced a year later with Poste-de-la-Baleine. On June 28, 1978, the Cree Village Municipality of Poste-de-la-Baleine was officially established. The Cree village was then officially renamed Whapmagoostui on May 8, 1996, from then on replacing all other toponyms.

In 2013, seven young men from the community journeyed  for "Nishiyuu", in support of Idle No More.

Economy
Whapmagoostui was founded around a Hudson's Bay Company post. The community later became the site of a military airport, now abandoned. Hunting is still an important part of the community.

Government
The police services are provided by the Eeyou Eenou Police Force.

Demographics
Population:
 Population in 2021: 1,022 (2016 to 2021 population change: +0.6%)
 Population in 2016: 1,016 (2011 to 2016 population change: +12.6%)
 Population in 2011: 874 (2006 to 2011 population change: +7.6%)
 Population in 2006: 812 (2001 to 2006 population change: +4.4%)
 Population in 2001: 778 (1996 to 2001 population change: +24.3%)
 Population in 1996: 626 (1991 to 1996 population change: +23.2%)
 Population in 1991: 508

Transportation
The community is only accessible by air via the Kuujjuarapik Airport and, in late summer, by boat.

Education
The Cree School Board operates the Badabin Eeyou School, which includes the Meeyow Bee Nooquow School. In 1982, the school was built, and in 1989, the first high school class graduated.

References

Further reading

 Adelson, Naomi. 'Being Alive Well': Health and the Politics of Cree Well-Being. Toronto: University of Toronto Press, 2000.
 Lussier, Catherine, Carole Lévesque, and Ginette Lajoie. Northern Ecosystem Initiative A Preliminary Community Perspective on Environmental Priorities, Whapmagoostui and Chisasibi. Montréal: INRS Culture et société, 2000.

External links
Kuujjauraapik official site

Cree villages in Quebec
Hudson's Bay Company trading posts
Populated places on Hudson Bay
Eeyou Istchee (territory)
Road-inaccessible communities of Quebec
1821 establishments in the British Empire